Berl Huffman (August 27, 1907 – October 16, 1990) was a college baseball, college basketball, and college football head coach. He coached at Texas Tech University and the University of New Mexico.

Coaching career

Baseball
Huffman was the fourth head coach of the Texas Tech Red Raiders baseball program. From the 1961 through the 1967 seasons, Huffman coached 167 games with an 80–87 record.

Basketball
In eight seasons as the head basketball coach at Texas Tech, Huffman garnered a record of 121–67. The record for his one season coaching basketball at New Mexico stands at 6–19.

Football
From 1936 to 1942, Huffman was an assistant coach with Texas Tech.

Head coaching record

Football

References

1907 births
1990 deaths
American men's basketball coaches
Texas Tech Red Raiders baseball coaches
Texas Tech Red Raiders football coaches
Texas Tech Red Raiders basketball coaches
New Mexico Lobos football coaches
New Mexico Lobos men's basketball coaches
Trinity University (Texas) alumni